The Chinese Ambassador to Guyana is the official representative of the People's Republic of China to the Co-operative Republic of Guyana.

List of representatives

References

Ambassadors of China to Guyana
Guyana
China